The 1916 Michigan Agricultural Aggies football team represented Michigan Agricultural College (MAC) as an independent during the 1916 college football season. In their first year under head coach Dutch Sommer, the Aggies compiled a 4–2–1 record and outscored their opponents 126 to 26.

Schedule

Game summaries

Michigan

The Aggies played their annual game against Michigan at Ferry Field on October 21, 1916. It was the 11th game between the two schools dating back to 1898.  Michigan had won seven of the prior ten games, but M.A.C. had defeated the Wolverines in 1915. Michigan won the 1916 game by a score of 9 to 0.  According to one account of the game, Michigan quarterback Cliff Sparks "crumpled the Aggie line almost every time he crashed into it and circled ends with ease, and was eel-like in running back punts." After two scoreless quarters, M.A.C's Baker in the fourth quarter fumbled a punt at M.A.C.'s 22-yard line. After gains of 10 yards by Sparks and eight yards by Cedric "Pat" Smith, left halfback John Maulbetsch finished the drive with a two-yard run for the touchdown. The game was played in 15-minute quarters.

References

Michigan Agricultural
Michigan State Spartans football seasons
Michigan Agricultural Aggies football